Dinny Pails defeated John Bromwich 4–6, 6–4, 3–6, 7–5, 8–6 in the final to win the men's singles tennis title at the 1947 Australian Championships.

Seeds
The seeded players are listed below. Dinny Pails is the champion; others show the round in which they were eliminated.

  John Bromwich (finalist)
  Dinny Pails (champion)
  Tom Brown (semifinals)
  Gardnar Mulloy (semifinals)
  Adrian Quist (quarterfinals)
  Lionel Brodie (quarterfinals)
  Bill Sidwell (quarterfinals)
  Colin Long (quarterfinals)
  Bill Talbert (second round)
  Geoffrey Brown (second round)
  Jack Crawford (first round)

Draw

Key
 Q = Qualifier
 WC = Wild card
 LL = Lucky loser
 r = Retired

Finals

Earlier rounds

Section 1

Section 2

External links
 

1947
1947 in Australian tennis